Wade Crosby (August 22, 1905 – October 2, 1975) was an actor in American films. He was also part of radio programs. He was in several Republic Pictures films.

Filmography

 Ride a Crooked Mile  (1938) as George Rotz
 Wagon Train (1940) as Wagonmaster O'Follard
 Sign of the Wolf (1941)
 Citadel of Crime (1941) as Rufe
 The Sundown Kid (1942)
 Shepherd of the Ozarks (1942) as Kirk
 The Woman of the Town (1943) as Crockett
 Headin' for God's Country (1943) as Jim Talbot
 Roaring Guns (1944)
 Cheyenne Wildcat (1944) as Henchman, uncredited
 Rough Riders of Cheyenne (1945)
 Bandits of the Badlands (1945)
 Traffic in Crime (1946)
 Monkey Businessmen (1946), a Three Stooges short comedy film
 The Peanut Man (1947)
 Along the Oregon Trail (1947) as Blacksmith Tom
 Under California Stars (1948) as Lige McFarland
 The Paleface as Jeb
 The Timber Trail (1948) as Henchman Walt
 Reign of Terror (1949) as Danton
 Rose of the Yukon (1949) as Alaskan
 Hit Parade of 1951 (1950) as Jake
 Tales of Robin Hood (1951) as Little John
 Invasion, U.S.A. as Illinois Congressman Arthur V. Harroway
 Rose of Cimarron (1952) as Henchman
 Old Overland Trail (1953)
 Prisoners of the Casbah (1953) as Yagoub
 Bandits of the West (1953) as Big Jim Foley
 J. W. Coop (1972) as Billy Sol Gibbs

Radio
 Death Valley Days
 Frontier Town (1949) as Remington's sidekick, Cherokee O'Bannon

Television
 Adventures of Wild Bill Hickok as Canfield (1951)
 Frontier Town

References

External links 

1905 births
1975 deaths
American male film actors
Male film serial actors
20th-century American male actors